{{Infobox film
| name           = The Argyle Case
| image          = The_Argyle_Case_1929_Poster.jpg
| caption        = theatrical release poster
| director       = Howard Bretherton
| producer       = 
| based_on       = The Argyle Case: a Drama in Four Acts (1912 play)Harriet FordHarvey J. O'HigginsWilliam J. Burns
| writer         = Harvey F. ThewDe Leon Anthony
| starring       = Thomas MeighanH.B. WarnerLila LeeJohn DarrowZasu Pitts
| music          = 
| cinematography = James Van Trees
| editing        = Thomas Pratt
| studio         = Warner Bros.
| distributor    = Warner Bros.
| released       = 
| runtime        = 85 minutes
| country        = United States
| language       = English
| budget         = 
| gross          = 
}}The Argyle Case'''  (1929) is an all-talking pre-code mystery film directed by Howard Bretherton and starring Thomas Meighan, H.B. Warner, Lila Lee, John Darrow and Zasu Pitts. The film was based on a play by Harriet Ford and Harvey J. O'Higgins. It was produced and released by Warner Bros.

The play was previously filmed as a silent in 1917, The Argyle Case''.

Premise
A wealthy man is shot just as he reaches for the phone to call for the police. Suspicion falls on his ward (Lila Lee) as he has intended to change his will, which had left his entire estate to her, to share it equally with his nephew. The nephew, who is in love with Lee, calls in a private detective, who eventually finds it is the lawyer who is the criminal.

Cast
Thomas Meighan as Alexander Kayton   
H. B. Warner as Hurley  
Lila Lee as Mary Morgan   
John Darrow as Bruce Argyle 
ZaSu Pitts as Mrs. Wyatt  
Bert Roach as Joe
Wilbur Mack as Sam
Douglas Gerrard as Finley
Alona Marlowe as Kitty
James Quinn as Skidd 
Gladys Brockwell as Mrs. Martin

Preservation status
No film elements are known to survive. The soundtrack, which was recorded on Vitaphone disks, may survive in private hands. The sound to four reels (Reels 3, 5, 7, and 9), out of nine reels, survives on Vitaphone disks at the UCLA Film and Television Archive.

References

External links

1929 films
1920s English-language films
American mystery films
Warner Bros. films
Films directed by Howard Bretherton
American black-and-white films
Lost American films
American films based on plays
1929 mystery films
1929 lost films
1920s American films